Aneta Vignerová (born 27 October 1987) is a beauty queen who won Miss Czech Republic as a 21-year-old and represented her country in Miss World 2009 in Johannesburg.

Personal life
She was two years in a relationship with Czech retired footballer Tomáš Ujfaluši., then with Ice hockey player Michal Gulaši. Nowadays, Vignerová is in relationship with another footballer Michal Zeman.

References

External links 
Instagram

Living people
1987 births
Czech beauty pageant winners
Czech female models
Association footballers' wives and girlfriends
Miss World 2009 delegates
People from Havířov